Cristian Andres Santana (born November 25, 2003) is a professional baseball shortstop from the Dominican Republic. He signed with the Detroit Tigers in January 2021. He received a $2.95 million signing bonus, the largest bonus ever paid by the Tigers to an international player. He spent the 2021 season playing in the Dominican Summer League, where he appeared in 54 games and compiled a .269 batting average with 9 home runs and 12 stolen bases. 

He trained with Alan Trammell before the 2022 season and stated that, "if God allows me, I plan to be better than him." During the 2022 season, he appeared in 72 games for the Tigers' Single-A Lakeland Flying Tigers, compiling a .207 batting average and a .377 on-base percentage with 54 bases on balls, eight home runs and 10 stolen bases.

References

External links

2003 births
Living people
Dominican Republic baseball players
Dominican Summer League Tigers players